Richard Lee Jones (December 21, 1893 – October 13, 1975) was an American diplomat.

Early life
Jones was born on December 21, 1893 in Albany, Georgia. He was of African ancestry. He studied at the University of Cincinnati in Ohio, where he received a Bachelor of Science. He later studied law at the University of Illinois until World War I began, in which he enlisted.

Diplomatic career
Jones was appointed by President Dwight D. Eisenhower to the position of United States Ambassador to Liberia on May 31, 1955. The presentation of his credentials occurred on June 24, 1955. He remained in this position until July 24, 1959.

Personal life
At some point in his life, Jones lived in Illinois.

Death
Jones died on October 13, 1975.

References

1893 births
1975 deaths
African-American diplomats
Ambassadors of the United States to Liberia
20th-century American diplomats
20th-century African-American people